Vic Lee (born 29 September 1946) is a veteran TV reporter in the San Francisco Bay Area in the United States.  He formerly works for KGO-TV, his reports being broadcast on the five o'clock news, the six o'clock news, and ABC7 news at nine on KOFY.

Early life
Lee was born in Shanghai, China and fled in 1949, to Tokyo, Japan. He went to The American School in Japan (1964) and San Jose State University Lee got an internship at the New York Times from his father's relationship with Abe Rosenthal.

Career
After college, he and college cohorts founded a marketing company, in New York City, National Academic Services, to college student governments.

Lee worked at KRON from 1972 to 2006, where he won several awards for his reporting, later working at KGO-TV.

He is known for his thorough political reporting and the myriads of contacts he has from his many years in the Bay Area.

On Wednesday, January 8, 2020, after 50 years of broadcasting in the San Francisco Bay Area, Lee announced his retirement.

References

External links
KGO-TV homepage,  Vic Lee.  Retrieved August 3, 2006.

Television personalities from San Francisco
People from Shanghai
American people of Chinese descent
Living people
1946 births
20th-century American journalists
American male journalists